The Arlington Oaks was an American Grade III Thoroughbred horse race run at Arlington Park racetrack near Chicago. Raced on dirt over a distance of 1 1/8 miles (9 Furlongs), the race is restricted to three-year-old fillies. It  offers a purse of $150,000.

Inaugurated in 1930, after the running of the 1932 edition, the race was not run again until 1980. There was no race in 1998 and 1999 and was run for the last time in 2014.

Known as the Arlington Oaks from 1930 to 1992 and in 2000, it was run as the Arlington Heights Oaks from 1993 to 1997, the Singapore Plate from 2001 to 2003, and as the Arlington Breeders' Cup Oaks in 2004.

In 1985, the race was hosted by the Hawthorne Race Course.

Historical notes
Alcibiades, Hal Price Headley's 1929 American Champion Two-Year-Old Filly won the July 5, 1930 inaugural running of the Arlington Oaks. She would end the year being selected the Three-Year-Old Champion Filly. The Grade 1 Alcibiades Stakes at Keeneland is named in her honor.

Canfli won the second edition of the Oaks for the stable of W. D. Waggoner and brothers from Texas. The New York Times reported that 25,000 racing patrons were on hand to see the 1931 race.

The Sonny Whitney owned  1932 Oaks winner Top Flight would also be named the Two and Three-Year-Old Filly Champion plus future induction into the U.S. Racing Hall of Fame.

In 2001, a year the race was run as the Singapore Plate, Caressing was the winner, following up on her 2000 Breeders' Cup Juvenile Fillies victory that had clinched Two-Year-Old National Champion Filly honors for her.

In 2005, film director John Gatins made a motion picture titled Dreamer: Inspired by a True Story in which the horse "Soñador" is based on 1994 Arlington Oaks winner, Mariah's Storm.

Records
Speed record:
 1:48 1/5 @ 1 1⁄8 miles: Choose A Partner (1983)

Most wins by a jockey:
 2 – Earlie Fires (1981, 1982)
 2 – Shane Sellers (1991, 1993)
 2 – Garrett Gomez (1992, 1997)
 2 – Robby Albarado (1996, 2006)
 2 – Mark Guidry (2000, 2007)
 2 – René Douglas (2001, 2002)

Most wins by a trainer:
 4 – Carl Nafzger (1983, 1989, 1991, 1995)

Most wins by an owner:
 2 – Russell L. Reineman Stable Inc. (1981, 1995)
 2 – Wimborne Farm (1993, 1996)
 2 – Stonerside Stable (1997, 2004)

Winners

External links
 The Arlington Oaks at Pedigree Query
 Arlington Park official website

References

Discontinued horse races
Horse races in Illinois
Flat horse races for three-year-old fillies
Recurring sporting events established in 1930
Recurring sporting events disestablished in 2014
Arlington Park
1930 establishments in Illinois
2014 disestablishments in Illinois